At least three ships of the French Navy have been named Armide:

 , lead ship of the  launched in 1804 and captured by Great Britain in 1806
 ,  an  launched in 1867 and expended as a target in 1886
 , lead ship of the  launched  in 1915 and stricken in 1932

French Navy ship names